The governor of Zamboanga del Norte is the local chief executive of the Philippine province of Zamboanga del Norte. The governor holds office at the Zamboanga del Norte Provincial Capitol. Like all local government heads in the Philippines, the governor is elected via popular vote, and may not be elected for a fourth consecutive term (although the former governor may return to office after an interval of one term). In case of death, resignation or incapacity, the vice governor becomes the governor.

History

Prior to 1952, present-day Zamboanga del Norte was governed by appointed or elected governors under the historical Moro Province (1903-1914) and Province of Zamboanga (1914-1952).

List

References

See also
2019 Zamboanga del Norte local elections

Governors of Zamboanga del Norte
Politics of Zamboanga del Norte
Zamboanga del Norte